Asok Montri Road, or Soi Sukhumvit 21 (also Asoke Montri Road), is a major road in Bangkok, Thailand. It is often referred to as simply Asok or Asoke. It runs north from Sukhuvmit Road and forms part of the Ratchadaphisek inner ring road. It contains many offices buildings and shops. Although the road has a capacity of 35,000, more than 100,000 vehicles use the road daily, causing major congestion. The junction of Sukhuvmit Road and Asok Montri Road is a major road junction known as Asok Intersection, and is also the location of Asok BTS Station and Sukhumvit MRT Station. In 2013 there were plans to build an elevated highway but  construction has not started.

References 

Streets in Bangkok